{{speciesbox
| name = Calliophis maculiceps
| image = 
| genus = Calliophis
| species = maculiceps
| authority = (Günther, 1858)
| synonyms = *Elaps maculiceps Günther, 1858: 232
Elaps melanurus Cantor, 1847 (not Shaw; fide M.A. Smith, 1943)
Calliophis maculiceps punctulatus Bourret, 1934
Callophis [sic] maculiceps — M.A. Smith, 1943: 420
Maticora maculiceps — Golay et al., 1993
Calliophis maculiceps — Manthey & Grossmann, 1997: 420
Calliophis maculiceps — Cox et al., 1998: 32
__
Calliophis maculiceps atrofrontalis (Sauvage, 1877)Elaps atrofrontalis Sauvage, 1877
Calliophis maculiceps atrofrontalis — Sang et al., 2009
__Calliophis maculiceps hughi (Cochran, 1927)Callophis hughi Cochran, 1927
Callophis hughi — M.A. Smith, 1943
Callophis hughi — Taylor, 1965
Maticora maculiceps hughi — Welch, 1994: 75
Calliophis maculiceps hughi — Sang et al., 2009
___Calliophis maculiceps maculiceps (Günther, 1858)Elaps maculiceps Günther, 1858
Maticora maculiceps maculiceps — Welch, 1994: 75
Calliophis maculiceps maculiceps — Sang et al., 2009
___Calliophis maculiceps michaelis Deuve 1961Calliophis maculiceps michaelis Deuve, 1961
Maticora maculiceps michaelis — Welch, 1994: 75
Calliophis maculiceps michaelis — Sang et al., 2009
___Calliophis maculiceps smithi Klemmer, 1963Callophis maculiceps var. univirgatus M.A. Smith, 1915 (nomen oblitum)
Calliophis maculiceps smithi Klemmer, 1963 (nomen novum)
Calliophis maculiceps smithi — Sang et al., 2009
}}Calliophis maculiceps, commonly known as the speckled coral snake or the small-spotted coral snake, is a species of venomous elapid snake endemic to Southeast Asia. Five subspecies are recognized, including the nominotypical subspecies.

Geographic range
C. maculiceps is found in Myanmar, Thailand, Laos, Cambodia, and Vietnam.

Subspecies
The following five subspecies are considered valid:

Calliophis maculiceps atrofrontalis (Sauvage, 1877)
Calliophis maculiceps hughi (Cochran, 1927)
Calliophis maculiceps maculiceps (Günther, 1858)
Calliophis maculiceps michaelis Deuve, 1961
Calliophis maculiceps smithi Klemmer, 1963

Nota bene: A trinomial authority in parentheses indicates that the subspecies was originally described in a genus other than Calliophis.

References

Further reading
 Boulenger GA. 1890. The Fauna of British India, Including Ceylon and Burma. Reptilia and Batrachia. London: Secretary of State for India in Council. (Taylor and Francis, printers). xviii + 541 pp. (Callophis [sic] maculiceps, p. 384).
 Boulenger GA. 1896. Catalogue of the Snakes in the British Museum (Natural History). Volume III., Containing the Colubridæ (Opisthoglyphæ and Proteroglyphæ), ... London: Trustees of the British Museum (Natural History). (Taylor and Francis, printers). xiv + 727 pp. + Plates I-XXV. (Callophis [sic] maculiceps, pp. 397–398).
 Golay P, Smith HM, Broadley DG, Dixon JR, McCarthy CJ, Rage J-C, Schätti B, Toriba M. 1993. Endoglyphs and Other Major Venomous Snakes of the World. A Checklist. Geneva: Azemiops Herpetological Data Center. xv + 478 pp.
 Günther A. 1858. Catalogue of the Colubrine Snakes in the Collection of the British Museum. London: Trustees of the British Museum. (Taylor and Francis, printers). xvi + 281 pp. (Elaps maculiceps, p. 232).
 Manthey U, Grossmann W. 1997. Amphibien und Reptilien Südostasiens. Münster: Natur und Tier Verlag. 512 pp. . (Calliophis maculiceps, p. 420).
 Smith MA. 1943. The Fauna of British India, Ceylon and Burma, Including the Whole of the Indo-Chinese Sub-region. Reptilia and Amphibia. Vol. III.—Serpentes. London: Secretary of State for India. (Taylor and Francis, printers). xii + 583 pp. (Callophis [sic] maculiceps, pp. 420–421).

External links
 Photo of Calliophis maculiceps in Khao Yai National Park, Thailand

maculiceps
Reptiles of Myanmar
Reptiles of Thailand
Reptiles of Laos
Reptiles of Cambodia
Reptiles of Vietnam
Reptiles described in 1858
Taxa named by Albert Günther
Snakes of Vietnam
Snakes of Asia